Dubina is a small unincorporated community in Fayette County, Texas, United States.  It currently is home to a population of about 44 persons, but it was once a thriving community.  It was the first Czech settlement in Texas and dates from 1856. It is located 90 miles west of Houston or 104 miles east of San Antonio. Most of the town since 2003 has been designated as the Dubina Historic District on the National Register of Historic Places.

The naming of this settlement as Dubina ("oak grove") goes back to one of the first nights spent by the settlers.  As the story goes, the settlers were travelling looking for a suitable place to settle down when it started raining.  They sat down under a very large oak tree for shelter and looked around realizing how comfortable this place was.  They then settled there giving it the appropriate name.

After the Civil War, Dubina became a toehold for recently arrived Czech immigrants. The nearby town of Hackberry was for German settlers.

Dubina has some historical buildings, the most famous of which is one of Texas's painted churches, Saints Cyril and Methodius.

See also

National Register of Historic Places listings in Fayette County, Texas

References

External links

 The Story of the Founding of Dubina
DUBINA - The First Czech Settlement in Texas

Unincorporated communities in Texas
Unincorporated communities in Fayette County, Texas
Czech-American culture in Texas
Historic districts on the National Register of Historic Places in Texas